Deputy Montfort Tadier (born 28 November 1979) is a Jersey politician, and a member of the States of Jersey.

Early life and education 
Montfort Tadier was born in the parish of St Helier in Jersey.

He was brought up in St Brelade and educated in the island at La Moye Primary School, Les Quennevais and Hautlieu Secondary Schools, before gaining a BA(Hons) in Modern Languages from the University of Sheffield.

Political career 
He was first elected in November 2008 as Deputy for the district of St Brelade No. 2, which consists of the vingtaines of La Moye and Les Quennevais. He gained one of the two seats in the district, coming second with 758 votes from a field of 8 candidates. He was re-elected in 2011 with a majority of 1,428 votes.

Though the Jersey government does not operate a formal system of party politics (the vast majority of members having been elected as independents), he identifies himself with green, social-democratic and socialist politics.

He is a founding member of the political pressure group Time4Change, which was formed in the response to the revelations, in early 2008, that systemic child abuse had occurred in a local care home during the 1960s–1980s. The group campaigns on various issues to do with constitutional reform, tax reform, social and environmental issues.

In December 2010 Deputy Montfort Tadier announced the possible formation of a new political party called Reform Jersey, However it was not until July 2014 that Reform Jersey was registered in the Royal Court of Jersey.

Since 2009 he has been running his own blog site.

He has served on the Education and Home Affairs Scrutiny Panel between 2008 – 2013 and is currently the vice-chairman of the Privileges and Procedures Committee.

Montfort Tadier was re-elected during the 2018 electoral campaign as Deputy for St Brelade District No. 2.

After the 2018 election Deputy Montfort Tadier was suspended from ministerial duties on 29 March 2019 because "the evening of 28 March, the Assistant Minister for Economic Development, Tourism, Sport and Culture (Deputy Montfort Tadier), sent an email to a number of States Members, calling for a Government employee to be “removed from States Employment” and suggesting that a number of Members “back a proposition to this effect”. The Deputy copied the named employee into this email and was subsequently deemed have broken the Ministerial Code of Conduct by the Chief Minister, Senator John Le Fondré.

References

External links

Living people
Deputies of Jersey
People from Saint Brélade
1979 births
People educated at Hautlieu School
Alumni of the University of Sheffield